Nothing Less Than an Archangel (Spanish: Nada menos que un arkángel) is a 1960 Spanish comedy film directed by Jaime D'Ors, Antonio del Amo and Esteban Madruga.

Cast
 Manuel Aroca 
 Inocencio Barbán 
 Roberto Camardiel 
 Félix Fernández 
 Elisa Hernandez 
 Guillermo Hidalgo 
 José Isbert as Don Fabián  
 Archibald L. Lyall
 José Moratalla 
 Enrique Núñez 
 Pedro Oliver
 Amelia Ortas 
 Marisa Prado as La joven americana  
 José Riesgo 
 Santiago Rivero 
 Luis Roses 
 Conrado San Martín as Paco  
 Antonio Vela as Boy with glasses in seaport with the tractor

References

Bibliography 
 de España, Rafael. Directory of Spanish and Portuguese film-makers and films. Greenwood Press, 1994.

External links 
 

1960 comedy films
Spanish comedy films
1960 films
1960s Spanish-language films
Films directed by Antonio del Amo
1960s Spanish films